The 2011–12 Top 14 competition was a French domestic rugby union club competition operated by the Ligue Nationale de Rugby (LNR). Home-and-away play began on August 26, 2011. Two new teams from the 2010–11 Rugby Pro D2 season were promoted to Top 14 this year, Lyon and Bordeaux Bègles in place of the two relegated teams, La Rochelle and Bourgoin.

Toulouse claimed the Bouclier de Brennus as champions for the 19th time, defeating Toulon 18–12 in the final on June 9, 2012 at Stade de France in Saint-Denis. At the other end of the table, Brive and Lyon were relegated.

Competition format
Each club played every other club twice. The second half of the season was conducted in the same order as the first, with the club at home in the first half of the season away in the second. This season maintained the format introduced the previous season for the knockout stage: the top two teams qualified directly to the semifinals, while teams ranked from third to sixth qualified for a quarterfinal held at the home ground of the higher-ranked team.

The teams

During the regular season, three teams changed coaches a total of four times:
 Toulon was forced to find a replacement for Philippe Saint-André once he was named to become the new head coach of the France national team, effective 1 December.  Bernard Laporte, a former France head coach (1999–2007), was named as Toulon's new head coach, and took over in September after Saint-André was granted an early release by Toulon.
 Perpignan sacked Jacques Delmas on 21 November, only four months after he had taken over from Jacques Brunel, who left to become the new head coach of Italy. The Catalans had lost seven of their 12 matches in all competitions under Delmas. Assistants Bernard Goutta and Christophe Manas were named as replacements.
 Bayonne sacked their entire coaching staff—director of rugby Christian Gajan, forwards coach Thomas Lièvremont and backs coach Frédéric Tauzin—on 6 December. Gajan's position was filled by Jean-Pierre Élissalde, former Japan head coach and also father of former France international and current Toulouse backs coach Jean-Baptiste Élissalde. After six weeks, in which Bayonne remained near the bottom of the table with two losses and one draw in league play, Élissalde was sacked on 16 January, with former Stade Français head coach Didier Faugeron named as his replacement.

Table

{| class="wikitable" width="450px" style="float:left; font-size:95%; margin-left:15px;"
|colspan="2" style="text-align:center" bgcolor="#FFFFFF" cellpadding="0" cellspacing="0"|Key to colors
|-
| style="background: #FFF60F;" |     
| League champions; receive a place in the 2012–13 Heineken Cup.
|-
| style="background: #3fff00;" |     
| Top two teams qualify directly to semifinals and receive places in the 2012–13 Heineken Cup.
|-
| style="background: #d8ffeb;" |     
| Third and fourth placed teams play their quarterfinal at home and also receive automatic Heineken Cup berths (but see note below).
|-
| style="background: #ccccff;" |     
| Fifth and sixth placed teams play their quarterfinal away and also receive automatic Heineken Cup berths (but see note below).
|-
| style="background: #ffffcc;" |     
| Biarritz qualified for the Heineken Cup because they won the 2011-12 European Challenge Cup.
|-
| style="background: #ff79B4;" |     
| Two teams relegated to the 2012–13 Rugby Pro D2.
|}

Due to the interplay between LNR's schedule for Heineken Cup qualification and the rules of European Rugby Cup (ERC), which operates both European cup competitions, it is theoretically possible that a team finishing as high as fourth in the league table may not qualify for the Heineken Cup. Under ERC rules, the winners of the Heineken Cup and European Challenge Cup each earn a place in the following season's Heineken Cup. If a team from France wins one of these competitions, the Top 14 will receive a seventh Heineken Cup place. However, if French teams win both cups, the Top 14 is capped at seven Heineken Cup places. Biarritz' victory in the Challenge Cup gave France an extra place for the 2012–13 Heineken Cup.

The LNR presents teams for the Heineken Cup in the following order, skipping any steps occupied by clubs outside the Top 14 or filled in a prior step. The clubs involved in each step for this season are indicated in the numbered list.
 Champion – Toulouse
 Runner-up – Toulon
 Heineken Cup holder – Skipped (won by Leinster of Pro12)
 Semifinalist that finished higher in the league table – Clermont
 Semifinalist that finished lower in the league table – Castres
 Challenge Cup holder – Biarritz
 Additional berths based on league position – Montpellier, Racing Métro

Under LNR rules, only Top 14 clubs are eligible for European competition. This means that in the (unlikely) event that the winner of one of the two European Cups is relegated from the Top 14 in the same season, its European place will go to a current Top 14 team, based on league position in that season.

Under another ERC rule, if teams from England, which is also capped at seven Heineken Cup places, win both European cups, the extra place will go to the highest-ranked non-English team in the European Rugby Club Rankings that is not already qualified for the Heineken Cup. If that club is in the Top 14, it will receive a Heineken Cup place regardless of its league position, as long as it avoids relegation.

For a team in the top six to be left out of the Heineken Cup, French teams must win both European Cups, and those teams must have finished outside the top six in the league while also avoiding relegation.

Playoffs
   
  
All times are in Central European Summer Time (UTC+2).

Quarter-finals

Semi-finals

Final

Statistics

Top points scorers 
Updated 19 May 2012

Top try scorers 
Updated 6 May 2012

See also
2011–12 Rugby Pro D2 season

References

External links

  Ligue Nationale de Rugby – Official website
 Top 14 on Planetrugby.com

Top 14 seasons
 
France